Last Battle: Legend of the Final Hero is a side-scrolling martial arts beat 'em up released for the Mega Drive/Genesis in 1989 by Sega. It was one of the six games that were available as part of the Genesis launch lineup in the U.S. The Japanese version, titled , is based on the manga and anime series Fist of the North Star (Hokuto no Ken in Japanese). Since the international version did not retain the Hokuto no Ken license, the graphics and characters' names were altered. It was the second Hokuto no Ken game released by Sega, following the Mark III original, released internationally as Black Belt. Versions for the Commodore 64 and Amiga based upon Last Battle were developed and released by Elite in Europe in 1991.

Gameplay
Last Battle is a side-scrolling action game similarly to its predecessor Black Belt. The player takes control of Aarzak (Kenshiro in the Japanese original), who fights against his enemies using his punches and kicks. Aarzak can attack while standing, jumping, and crouching, for a total of six basic attacks. In addition to his life gauge, Aarzak has a power-up meter that will gradually fill as he defeats enemies. When the meter reaches a certain point (depending on the stage), Aarzak will transform into a super-powered state, allowing him to perform rapid punches and kicks for the rest of the stage. The game's levels (with the exception of boss battles and maze stages) feature a time limit at the lower-right corner of the screen; but unlike other time limits, instead of killing the character immediately when it reaches zero, it will instead gradually drain the player's life gauge until the player completes the level.

The game is divided into four stages or chapters, each featuring several levels. After completing a level the player will be shown a map which displays the player's current location and the paths they can take. Most of the levels are linear side-scrolling segments where the player must simply walk from one to side to the other while fighting every enemy who gets in the way. Other levels are dungeon mazes in which the player must figure out the correct path to the goal while avoiding traps. The player will encounter various allies throughout the game that will increase Aarzak's offensive or defensive strength, or replenish their health. The game features several one-on-one encounters with bosses as well. The player must sometime complete levels in a certain order in order to finish a chapter.

'Last Battle' is also notorious amongst gamers for its harsh difficulty throughout.

Ports
Because the English localization of the game did not retain the Fist of the North Star license, the developers changed the names of all characters, as well as their fighting styles, although the plot is relatively unchanged. The original Japanese version is specifically based on the later chapters of the manga (chapters 137-210), which is the portion that was also covered in the Hokuto no Ken 2 TV series. Kenshiro was renamed Aarzak and his two sidekicks from the series, Bat and Lin, became Max and Alyssa. Duke, the initial antagonist is actually Falco, while the three Rashō were rewritten into rebel generals of the empire that after the defeat of Duke escaped and schemed a plot to exact their revenge on Aarzak.

Also, the blood and gore from the original game was edited out of the western localizations. In the original game, any of the normal enemies would have their heads explode, followed by their bodies in a bloody fashion as well as some boss characters having more of a gory finishes to their fights. Last Battle, however, edited down the gore so that the normal enemies would only fly offscreen when hit and many of the bloody animations for the bosses were removed or some of the bosses were recolored to look more like mutants than humans.

List of name changes

Reception

Last Battle received mixed-to-poor reviews from critics, with criticism towards its stiff controls, poor dialogue and no continues. MegaTech magazine said it was "a failure on two counts: it neither shows off any of the Mega Drive's capabilities, nor is an enjoyable game in its own right". Mega placed the game at #2 in their list of the 10 Worst Mega Drive Games of All Time.

References

External links

Shin Seikimatsu Kyūseishu Densetsu Hokuto no Ken at Sega's Virtual Console page 

1989 video games
Amiga games
Sega beat 'em ups
Commodore 64 games
Fist of the North Star video games
Martial arts video games
Sega Genesis games
Post-apocalyptic video games
Video games developed in Japan
Virtual Console games